Don Tourliev "Danny" Maseng is an Israeli-born performer. An actor, singer and writer, Maseng is known as a composer of contemporary Jewish Liturgical music. He currently leads MAKOM LA, a spiritual community in Los Angeles, California.

Biography 

Maseng was born in Tel Aviv, Israel to an American born-Jewish mother and a Norwegian-American Lutheran father who came to Israel to serve as a volunteer in the Air Force during  the 1948 Arab–Israeli War  and later converted to Judaism. Maseng rose to stardom in Israel at a young age and was the star of one of the first TV shows in Israel. Maseng came to America in 1971 to star on Broadway in the musical Only Fools are Sad under the patronage of Golda Meir.

After his Broadway run, Maseng remained in the States, living in several cities before becoming a practicing Buddhist and student of the late Dainin Katagiri Roshi in Minneapolis. He later found his way back to Judaism and became involved in the Reform Judaism movement through the Olin Sang Ruby Union Institute, where he ran the Tiferet Arts program for eight years.

Maseng resides with his wife in Los Angeles, California. He has three sons, Jonathan, Carmel and Jordan.

Theater, music and television career 

Maseng directed and starred in productions in Minneapolis, including Cold Storage and The Day they Shot John Lennon for the Genesis Theater; The Secret Rapture; the Minnesota Opera's production of Carousel (musical); and the Ron Hutchinson (screenwriter) play Rat in the Skull with British Actor Richard Lumsden for the Theater Exchange.

After returning to New York in the early 1990s, Maseng had roles in the Circle Repertory Company's production of A Body of Water and starred as Manasseh Da Costa ("King of Schnorrers") in the revival of the Broadway Musical King of Schnorrers in Los Angeles at the then "Westwood" now Geffen Playhouse.

In 1995, Maseng debuted his critically acclaimed one man show Wasting Time with Harry Davidowitz at the John Houseman Theater off-broadway, where it enjoyed a long run and has since toured with it abroad.

Maseng has released a dozen albums and appeared as a guest star on numerous television shows including many of the shows in the Law & Order franchise, Wild Discovery and One Life to Live; and has also done extensive voice-over work for JoS. A. Bank, American Express, Hewlett Packard and Hoehn Motors.

Maseng's song "Elohai N'tzor" was covered by Pink Martini on their 2010 Album Joy to the World (Pink Martini album).

Jewish career 

In addition to his performing and composing, Maseng helped found and run the Steven Spielberg Theater Fellowships for the Foundation for Jewish Camping and also served as the Artistic Director of the Brandeis-Bardin Institute in California. He was also the founding director of the Jewish Arts Institute, a program run out of the Isabella Freedman Jewish Retreat Center in Falls Village, Connecticut.

Maseng ran the Hava Nashira Jewish Songleader's institute for several years, where he worked closely with Debbie Friedman, Craig Taubman, and other prominent Jewish musicians.

For several years, Maseng served as the spiritual leader for Congregation Agudas Achim in Livingston Manor, New York. He later served as the Artist-In-Residence/Cantor for Temple Israel of Columbus in Ohio. Maseng served as the Chazzan and Music Director of Temple Israel of Hollywood from 2008-2015.

In 2007, Maseng was appointed the Patron Artist of the Jewish Institute of Cantorial Arts at the University of Potsdam in Germany, the first cantorial school in Germany since the Holocaust.

Maseng has been involved in many interfaith and peace efforts. In 2008 he performed in honor of Prince Hassan bin Talal at the Abraham Geiger award ceremony in Germany. He has also been a supporter of J Street, the liberal Jewish advocacy group that seeks a peaceful end to the Israeli-Palestinian conflict.

In 2015 Maseng founded MAKOM LA, a spiritual community in Los Angeles, CA.

Partial discography

 Beyond the Gates - 2014
 Heaven on Earth - 2010
 Just Like Home (With Michael Skloff) - 2008
 Yedid Nefesh - 2004
 Labor of Love - 2002
 Tapuach Zahav (Reissue: Hataklit Records) - 2001
 Soul on Fire - 2000
 Wasting Time With Harry Davidowitz - 1996
 Songs for the Sabbath (SISU) - 1995
 On Silver Wings - 1982
 Danny Maseng: First Edition (ACUM Records) - 1975

Compilations

 Danny Maseng Retrospective (Hataklit Records) - 2014
 Immersed: Music for Mayyim Hayyim - 2007
 Celebrate Shabbat (Craig N Co) - 2006
 American Jewish Summer (Jewish Music Group) - 2006
 Mitzvah Music - 2005
 Shabbat Anthology: Volume One (Transcontinental) - 2003
 Kol Dodi: Jewish Music for Weddings (URJ) - 2002
 Ruach 5761: New Jewish Tunes (Transcontinental) - 2001
 Israel Our Homeland: The First Songs (ACUM) -1981
 The Songs of Israel (ACUM) - 1980

Partial filmography

 Above and Beyond (2014) Segment on DVD Extras
 The Other Men in Black (2013)
 Hava Nagila: The Movie (2012)
 Blessed Is the Match: The Life and Death of Hannah Senesh (2008)
 Law & Order: Criminal Intent (2002) 1 Episode
 Law & Order: SVU (1999-2001) 2 Episodes
 Deadline (2000 TV series) (2000) 1 Episode
 Law & Order (1993-2000) 3 Episodes
 Prince Street (1997) 1 Episode
 Muhammad Ali: The Whole Story (1996)
 Wildest Africa (1995)
 One Life to Live (1994)

References

External links

 Danny Maseng's website

Living people
Year of birth missing (living people)
Israeli people of Norwegian descent
Israeli people of American-Jewish descent
Israeli songwriters
20th-century Israeli male singers
Jewish composers
Place of birth missing (living people)
21st-century Israeli male singers
Israeli people of American descent